The women's competition in the lightweight (– 58 kg) division was staged on November 23, 2009.

Schedule

Medalists

Records

Results

References
Results

- Women's 58 kg, 2009 World Weightlifting Championships
World